Castor Bay is a bay and suburb of the North Shore, located in Auckland which is in the North Island of New Zealand. Located between Milford and Campbells Bay, it is part of the East Coast Bays. To the east lies the islands of Rangitoto and Motutapu, which are easily visible from land. The suburb is in the North Shore ward, one of the thirteen administrative divisions of Auckland Council.

The bay itself is quite small and is well sheltered by an artificial breakwater that extends from the northern edge of the bay, running towards the south. A small bark and grass area with several large pohutukawa trees offering shelter complements the beachfront and an extended coastline stretches out to the north towards Campbells Bay.

History

The northern headland of Castor Bay is the site of an old Maori pā, Rahopara, also known as Te Rahopara o Peretū. Archaeological studies of the pā indicate that it was used by many generations of Tāmaki Māori peoples, who adapted the pā overtime. The name of the pā is associated with Peretū, an ancestor of the Ngāi Tai ki Tāmaki people. Traditional histories recount Te Patukirikiri ancestor Kapetaua sacking the pā in the 17th century, as revenge for being marooned at Te Toka-o-Kapetaua (Bean Rock). The archaeological site was almost destroyed in 1965, as the earthworks were planned to be excavated and used as fill for a marina. Plans for this were cancelled after lobbying by archaeologists and local residents.

A coastal artillery battery was built during World War II, to protect the Rangitoto Channel. Two gun emplacements and the observation post used to survey the Hauraki Gulf are still present in John F. Kennedy Park, which is accessible from Castor Bay by road (Beach Road) or by walkway (from the extended coastline to the north).

Demographics

Castor Bay had a population of 4,509 at the 2018 New Zealand census, an increase of 204 people (4.7%) since the 2013 census, and an increase of 393 people (9.5%) since the 2006 census. There were 1,563 households, comprising 2,184 males and 2,322 females, giving a sex ratio of 0.94 males per female. The median age was 42.0 years (compared with 37.4 years nationally), with 810 people (18.0%) aged under 15 years, 798 (17.7%) aged 15 to 29, 2,190 (48.6%) aged 30 to 64, and 708 (15.7%) aged 65 or older.

Ethnicities were 76.2% European/Pākehā, 3.9% Māori, 1.2% Pacific peoples, 21.5% Asian, and 2.9% other ethnicities. People may identify with more than one ethnicity.

The percentage of people born overseas was 39.5, compared with 27.1% nationally.

Although some people chose not to answer the census's question about religious affiliation, 54.2% had no religion, 35.7% were Christian, 0.5% were Hindu, 1.1% were Muslim, 1.3% were Buddhist and 2.1% had other religions.

Of those at least 15 years old, 1,449 (39.2%) people had a bachelor's or higher degree, and 237 (6.4%) people had no formal qualifications. The median income was $46,600, compared with $31,800 nationally. 1,233 people (33.3%) earned over $70,000 compared to 17.2% nationally. The employment status of those at least 15 was that 1,899 (51.3%) people were employed full-time, 567 (15.3%) were part-time, and 105 (2.8%) were unemployed.

Education
The local primary school is Campbells Bay Primary School located on Aberdeen Road, nearby the Pupuke Golf Course.

Local government 

In 1989, Castor Bay was a part of the North Shore City. North Shore City was amalgamated into Auckland Council in November 2010. Within the Auckland Council, Castor Bay is a part of the Devonport-Takapuna local government area governed by the Devonport-Takapuna Local Board. It is a part of the North Shore ward, which elects two councillors to the Auckland Council.

Notable people
Sam Hunt, one of New Zealand's most well known poets, was born in Castor Bay.

Notes

External links
 Campbells Bay School website
 Photographs of Castor Bay held in Auckland Libraries' heritage collections.

Suburbs of Auckland
North Shore, New Zealand
Bays of the Auckland Region
East Coast Bays